Charles Hay (October 28, 1843 – November 14, 1924) was a Scottish-Canadian merchant and political figure in Manitoba, Canada. He represented Norfolk from 1883 to 1886 in the Legislative Assembly of Manitoba as a Liberal.

He was born on Flotta, Orkney, the son of James Hay, local school principal, and came to Portage la Prairie, Manitoba in 1862. In 1869, Hay married Annie Munro Wild. He was postmaster at Portage la Prairie and served on the council for the Rural Municipality of Portage la Prairie. Hay was also a justice of the peace. He was a member of the firm Campbell, Hay and Boddy.

Around 1914, Hay retired to Vancouver, British Columbia, where he died at the age of 81.

References 

1843 births
1924 deaths
19th-century Scottish people
19th-century Canadian people (post-Confederation)
People from Orkney
Manitoba Liberal Party MLAs
Scottish emigrants to pre-Confederation Quebec
Scottish merchants
People from Portage la Prairie
Scottish emigrants to Canada